Angela M. O'Donnell is an educational psychologist at Rutgers University who has made substantial contributions to the understanding of collaborative learning (O'Donnell, Hmelo-Silver, & Erkens, 2006), and is the co-author of a widely used introductory textbook (O'Donnell, Reeve, & Smith, 2007). She is a member of the editorial review boards of Contemporary Educational Psychology, Educational Psychologist, Educational Psychology Review, the Journal of Experimental Education, and the Journal of Educational Psychology.

References
O'Donnell, A. M., Reeve, J. M., & Smith, J. K. (2007). Educational psychology: Reflection for action. Hoboken, NJ: John Wiley & Sons.
O'Donnell, A. M., Hmelo-Silver, C., & Erkens, G. (2006). Collaborative learning, reasoning, and technology. Mahwah, NJ: Lawrence Erlbaum.
O'Donnell, A. M., & King, A. (1999). Cognitive perspectives on peer learning. Mahwah, NJ: Lawrence Erlbaum.

External links
Angela O'Donnell web page

Rutgers University faculty
American women psychologists
Educational psychologists
Living people
Year of birth missing (living people)
American women academics
21st-century American women
American educational psychologists